Reth   (International Title: Sands Of Times)was one of the popular Zee TV serial that aired between 12 July 2004 and 3 February 2006, based on the story of a young daughter-in-law Jiya who is in conflict with her new family.

Plot
A rape victim tries to regain her honour after being gang raped. Jiya was a typical middle-class bahu till one event changes everything for her. In order to save her unmarried sister-in-law from rape she throws herself before the rapists. While her marital family appreciates her sacrifice, they do not completely accept her back. She battles the stigma despite being ostracised.

Cast
 Tejal Shah / Deepa Parab as Jiya Shekhar Pandey
 Diwakar Pundir as Kshom
 Ankur Nayyar / Sachin Verma as Shekhar Pandey
 Amrapali Gupta as Aarushi (Aaru) Pandey
 Nupur Alankar as Devyani Samar Pandey 
 Kamya Panjabi as Netra Shekhar Pandey 
 Kishwer Merchant as Dr. Dakshi
 Kanika Maheshwari as Chhavi
 Anang Desai as Gyan Pandey
 Anita Wahi / Utkarsha Naik as Rukmini Gyan Pandey 
 Sai Deodhar as Tanu
 Harsh Vashisht as Manas
 Amardeep Jha as Devyani's mother 
 Suhita Thatte as Jiya's mother 
 Rajeev Kumar as Samar Pandey
 Shilpa Tulaskar as Kshom and Chhavi's mother 
 Rajeev Bharadwaj as Harsh: Aarushi's husband
 Girish Jain as Harsh: Aarushi's boyfriend

Production
The series had a crossover with Astitva... Ek Prem Kahani.

References

External links
Official Site

2004 Indian television series debuts
2006 Indian television series endings
Indian television soap operas
Zee TV original programming